Macerata Campania is a comune (municipality) in the Province of Caserta in the Italian region Campania, located about  north of Naples and about  west of Caserta.

Macerata Campania borders the following municipalities: Casagiove, Casapulla, Curti, Marcianise, Portico di Caserta, Recale, Santa Maria Capua Vetere.

History 
Its history is linked, for its origins, with the ancient city of Capua, corresponding to the current Santa Maria Capua Vetere, because it had been  part of the latter for many centuries, until the year 841 (the year of the invasion of the Saracens, who destroyed ancient Capua). The population was dominated by Lombards, Normans, Swabians, Angevins and Aragonese. According to Francesco Granata[8] the ancient city of Capua extended in a territory of about six miles and, in the XVIII century, it was occupied by the hamlets of S. Maria Maggiore, S. Pietro in Corpo, Curti, Macerata and S. Andrea de' Lagni. Furthermore, near the chapel of the Blessed Virgin of Graces of Macerata Campania there was the ancient Porta Atellana of Capua from which the Via Atellana started, leading to the  farmhouse of Macerata that linked ancient Capua with  Atella [9][10].

Coat of arms and banner 
The Municipality of Macerata Campania has its own blue coat of arms, composed of a silver cow, fixed on the green plain, with a gold band. The municipal banner consists of a yellow cloth, richly decorated with silver embroidery, depicting the coat of arms, and at the centre there is  the name of the municipality in silver. Both the coat of arms and the banner are defined in Article 4 of the municipal statute[11].

References

[ [History} }

Cities and towns in Campania